Charlotte Anora Elizabeth Clymer (born October 11, 1986) is an American activist, press secretary, and writer. She was previously the press secretary for rapid response at the Human Rights Campaign and the director of communications and strategy at Catholics for Choice.

Career 
Clymer joined the United States Army in 2005, and later enrolled in the United States Military Academy. Clymer was assigned to the 3rd U.S. Infantry Regiment (The Old Guard), based at Arlington National Cemetery, until 2012. After leaving the Army, she moved to Washington, D.C. and took a job as a visitor services representative at the United States Holocaust Memorial Museum. After working there for a year, Clymer enrolled at Georgetown University and finished her bachelor's degree.

In 2017, Clymer began working at the Human Rights Campaign, the largest LGBTQ advocacy group and political lobbying organization in the United States. In 2020, Clymer was included in Fortune magazine's 40 Under 40 list in the "Government and Politics" category. From January through May 2021, Clymer was the director of communications and strategy for Catholics for Choice, an abortion rights dissenting Catholic advocacy group based in Washington, D.C.

Clymer is an outspoken activist on issues including LGBTQ rights, feminism, and veterans' affairs.

Personal life 
Clymer was raised in central Texas, after moving with her mother from Utah at a young age. In November 2017, she came out as a transgender woman. Clymer is an Episcopalian.

References

External links 
 

20th-century American women writers
21st-century American women writers
Activists from Texas
Activists from Washington, D.C.
American LGBT military personnel
American political activists
American press secretaries
American veterans' rights activists
Georgetown University alumni
LGBT people from Texas
LGBT people from Utah
LGBT people from Washington, D.C.
American LGBT rights activists
Living people
Transgender military personnel
Transgender women
Transgender writers
Transgender rights activists
United States Army soldiers
Writers from Texas
Writers from Washington, D.C.
Writers from Utah
Women civil rights activists
21st-century American LGBT people
American Episcopalians
LGBT Christians
1986 births